The Office of Production Management was a United States Government agency that existed from January 1941 to centralize direction of the federal procurement programs and quasi-war production during the period immediately proceeding the United States' involvement in World War II. After the United States formally entered World War II, the War Production Board superseded the Office of Production Management in January 1942 and the office ceased to exist shortly thereafter. It was established and distestablished by Executive Order of President Franklin D. Roosevelt.

References

Defunct agencies of the United States government
Agencies of the United States government during World War II
Government agencies established in 1941
Government agencies disestablished in 1942